Euplagia is a genus of tiger moths in the family Erebidae. The genus was erected by Jacob Hübner in 1820.

Species
 Euplagia quadripunctaria (Poda, 1761)
 Euplagia splendidior (Tams, 1922)

References

Callimorphina
Moth genera